Midtjyllands Avis (also known as MJA) is a Danish language local newspaper based in Silkeborg, Denmark. It is one of the oldest newspapers in the country, being established in 1857.

History and profile
MJA was first published in 1857. Its owner was a family company until 1998. The paper is owned by Silkeborg Avis Holding, part of JP/Politikens Hus and has its headquarters in Silkeborg.

MJA is published daily except Sundays by Midtjyllands Avis A/S, a subsidiary of Mediehuset Herning Folkeblad A/S. Mediehuset Herning Folkeblad also publishes Herning Folkeblad and Ikast Avis. MJA was published in broadsheet format until 14 April 2011 when it switched to tabloid format. The paper has a right-wing stance.

The circulation of MJA was 18,000 copies in the first half of 2000, making it one of the twenty best selling newspapers in Denmark.

References

External links
 Official website

Daily newspapers published in Denmark
Danish-language newspapers
Mass media in Silkeborg
Newspapers established in 1857